Plocetes is a genus of leguminous seed weevils in the beetle family Curculionidae. There are more than 60 described species in Plocetes.

Species
These 68 species belong to the genus Plocetes:

 Plocetes acalyptoides (Hustache, 1930)
 Plocetes agminalis Clark, 1982
 Plocetes ancylus Clark, 1983
 Plocetes annulifer Clark, 1982
 Plocetes apicalis Clark, 1982
 Plocetes apparitio Clark, 1982
 Plocetes appendiculatus Clark, 1982
 Plocetes auriculatus Clark, 1982
 Plocetes avertifer Clark, 1982
 Plocetes bahamensis (Casey, 1910)
 Plocetes beluosus Clark, 1982
 Plocetes bicinctus Clark, 1982
 Plocetes binarmentum Clark, 1982
 Plocetes brevis Clark, 1982
 Plocetes bursiger Clark, 1982
 Plocetes cassidula Clark, 1982
 Plocetes catenatus Clark, 1982
 Plocetes cerberus Clark, 1982
 Plocetes clarki Anderson, 1991
 Plocetes cultriger Clark, 1982
 Plocetes denticulatus Clark, 1982
 Plocetes dufaui (Hustache, 1930)
 Plocetes dumosus Clark, 1982
 Plocetes empusa Clark, 1982
 Plocetes exclamationis Clark, 1982
 Plocetes falconiger Clark, 1982
 Plocetes faunus Clark, 1982
 Plocetes folliculus Clark, 1982
 Plocetes forcipiger Clark, 1982
 Plocetes geminus Clark, 1982
 Plocetes hamifer Clark, 1982
 Plocetes hebetatus Clark, 1983
 Plocetes incilatus Clark, 1983
 Plocetes infundibulum Clark, 1982
 Plocetes longirostris Clark, 1982
 Plocetes magnarmentum Clark, 1982
 Plocetes maniculatus Clark, 1982
 Plocetes maniola Clark, 1982
 Plocetes mergifer Clark, 1982
 Plocetes minor Clark, 1982
 Plocetes multidentatus Clark, 1982
 Plocetes narniensis Clark, 1982
 Plocetes obscurus Clark, 1982
 Plocetes ornatus Clark, 1982
 Plocetes parvidens Clark, 1982
 Plocetes pecusculum Clark, 1982
 Plocetes pegasus Clark, 1982
 Plocetes pilatus Clark, 1982
 Plocetes porosus Clark, 1982
 Plocetes pusillus Clark, 1982
 Plocetes rufescens Clark, 1982
 Plocetes rutrifer Clark, 1982
 Plocetes sacculifer Clark, 1982
 Plocetes seminiger Clark, 1982
 Plocetes senarius Clark, 1982
 Plocetes seriatus Clark, 1982
 Plocetes simulacrifer Clark, 1982
 Plocetes singularipes Clark, 1982
 Plocetes subfasciatus Clark, 1982
 Plocetes suturalis Clark, 1982
 Plocetes ulmi LeConte, 1876
 Plocetes unicornis Clark, 1982
 Plocetes uniguttatus Clark, 1982
 Plocetes urceus Clark, 1982
 Plocetes utriculifer Clark, 1982
 Plocetes velatus Clark, 1983
 Plocetes versicolor Clark, 1982
 Plocetes zonatus Clark, 1982

References

Further reading

 
 
 

Curculioninae
Articles created by Qbugbot